Wat is a masculine given name or nickname, often a diminutive variant of the given name Walter, and sometimes a modernized form of the name Watt, especially in Scotland, North East England and Southern England.

People named Wat include:

 Wat Tyler Cluverius Jr. (1874–1952), U.S. Navy rear admiral
 Wat T. Cluverius IV (1934–2010), American diplomat
 Wat Jones (1917–1994), Welsh cricketer
 Wat Misaka (1923–2019), American basketball player
 Walter Scott (Australian footballer) (1899–1989), Australian rules footballer
 Wat Tyler (1341–1381), leader of the English Peasants' Revolt

See also
 Walter Scott of Harden (c. 1563–1629), Scottish Border Reiver, known as "Auld Wat"

Masculine given names
Hypocorisms